AASCA Volleyball Tournament is a Volleyball Tournament hosted once a year by a school member of the Association of American Schools in Central America. The host school is rotated throughout all of the member schools. The tournament is set up to be played two years in a row as a "Big School Tournament" and the third year as an "Invitational Tournament" in which small schools can also participate. The tournament is hosted most of the time by a small school.

The 2010 and 2011 AASCA Volleyball Tournaments have been dominated by Escuela Internacional Sampedrana that has won both of the finals against the American School of Tegucigalpa.

The 2012 AASCA Volleyball Tournament were held on April 18, 2012, hosted by Colegio Decroly Americano in Guatemala City. The school hosted their first AASCA Tournament event. The favorites for the year are Escuela Internacional Sampedrana which won the event in the previous year in the Men's and Women's bracket. The Escuela Internacional Sampedrana men's team suffered great loss of players due to graduation, but emerging junior Sergio Solis was expected to step up for his team, given that he was the only survivor of that Championship team.

Results

Men

References

External links 
 AASCAonline.net

International volleyball competitions
Volleyball in Central America